Tommy Lee Smith, Jr. (born December 4, 1980) is an American professional basketball player. He played his college basketball at Arizona State University. A 6'10" and 215 lb power forward, Smith attended North High School and was selected in the 2nd round of the 2003 NBA Draft by the Chicago Bulls.

A highlight of the 2002–03 season was a 16-rebound, 6-block performance in an 89-57 win over Washington on January 9, 2003.

On December 28, 2011, he was acquired by the Dakota Wizards.

On January 17, 2013, he was acquired by the Fort Wayne Mad Ants.

Smith competes for the Ants Alumni in The Basketball Tournament. He was a center on the 2015 team who made it to the semifinals, falling 87-76 to Team 23.

References

External links
NBA D-League Profile
Profile at Eurobasket.com

1980 births
Living people
ABA League players
American expatriate basketball people in China
American expatriate basketball people in Croatia
American expatriate basketball people in the Dominican Republic
American expatriate basketball people in Germany
American expatriate basketball people in the Philippines
American expatriate basketball people in Syria
American men's basketball players
Arizona State Sun Devils men's basketball players
Artland Dragons players
Basketball players from Phoenix, Arizona
Chicago Bulls draft picks
Dakota Wizards players
Fort Wayne Mad Ants players
KK Split players
Liaoning Flying Leopards players
Power forwards (basketball)
San Miguel Beermen players
Philippine Basketball Association imports